Fight for the Sky is a board game published in 1982 by Attactix Adventure Games.

Contents
Fight for the Sky is a game about the Battle of Britain in which the first week after the Adlertag is covered.

Reception
Lee Brimmicombe-Wood reviewed Fight for the Sky for Games International magazine, and gave it 2 stars out of 5, and stated that "it's not a totally bad game. Unfortunately it's not a totally brilliant one either."

Reviews
Fire & Movement #72

References

Board games introduced in 1982